Richard Coulter Drum (May 28, 1825 – October 15, 1909) was Adjutant General of the United States Army from 1880 to 1889.

Early life
He was born in Greensburg, Pennsylvania, and graduated from Jefferson College before entering the printing business.

At the outbreak of the Mexican–American War in 1846, he enlisted as a private in the 1st Pennsylvania Volunteers, and, the next year, was commissioned a second lieutenant in the 9th Infantry of the Regular Army. He took part in many of the battles of the war, including Chapultepec and Mexico City.

Following the war, he was transferred to the Fourth Artillery and was promoted to first lieutenant. He served as an aide-de-camp for General William S. Harney during his expedition against the Sioux, and participated in the Battle of Ash Hollow.

Civil War
In 1861 he was appointed as an assistant adjutant general for the far-flung Department of the Pacific and promoted to captain. He was quickly promoted to major and lieutenant colonel, and after the end of the American Civil War he was brevetted Colonel and brigadier general, for faithful and meritorious services in the Adjutant-General's Department during the war.

Drum was a companion of the District of Columbia Commandery of the Military Order of the Loyal Legion of the United States - a prestigious military society composed of officers of the Union armed forces and their descendants.

Among other honors, both Camp Drum, a 60-acre army base in Wilmington, CA, and Fort Drum (Philippines), the so-called "Concrete Battleship" situated at the mouth of Manila Bay were named for him.

Later service
Drum was Assistant Adjutant General for the Department of California from June 1865 to October 1, 1866. He was appointed Assistant Adjutant General for the Department of the East, with headquarters in Philadelphia, Pennsylvania from December 27, 1866, to January 6, 1868. He was appointed Assistant Adjutant-General, for the 3rd Military District to August 1, 1868, and Department of the South, headquarters Atlanta, Georgia from March 20, 1868 to March 20, 1869, and from April 3, 1869 to November 26, 1873 for the Military Department of the Atlantic.

Drum was promoted to colonel on February 22, 1869. He was again made Assistant Adjutant-General, for the Military Division of the Missouri, in Chicago from November 28, 1873 to May 2, 1878, where he commanded the Federal troops in the Great Railroad Strike of 1877. He then served until retirement in the Adjutant Generals office in Washington, D.C.

On June 16, 1880, he became Adjutant General of the United States Army and was promoted to brigadier general.  He retired on May 20, 1889.

Death
General Drum died in Drummond, Maryland in 1909. He is buried in Arlington National Cemetery.

Memberships
In 1871 he became a member of the Aztec Club of 1847, a military society for officers who served in the Mexican War and their descendants. In 1896 he became a Veteran Companion of the Military Order of Foreign Wars by right of his service in the Mexican–American War. He was also a Companion of the District of Columbia Commandery of the Military Order of the Loyal Legion of the United States.

References

External links
 

1825 births
1909 deaths
Adjutants general of the United States Army
American military personnel of the Mexican–American War
American people of the Indian Wars
Burials at Arlington National Cemetery
People from Westmoreland County, Pennsylvania
People of Pennsylvania in the American Civil War
Union Army officers
United States Army generals
Washington & Jefferson College alumni